Salisbury City Council is a parish-level council for Salisbury, England. It was established in April 2009 and is based in the city's historic Guildhall. Following the May 2021 election, no party has an overall majority.

Population
The civil parish of Salisbury – which excludes some of the city's suburbs and satellite villages such as Old Sarum, Laverstock, Hampton Park, Britford, Netherhampton and Odstock – had a population of 40,302 at the 2011 census.

Establishment
As New Sarum, Salisbury has been ranked as a city since "time immemorial". The Local Government Act 1972, which took effect in 1974, eliminated the New Sarum City Council, administered under its charters, with the new  Salisbury District Council taking over its administrative functions. However, the status of a city was preserved after 1974 by the Charter trustees of the City of New Sarum. That name was formally changed from "New Sarum" to "Salisbury" by the 2009 structural changes to local government in England which created a civil parish of Salisbury and a new Salisbury City Council as its first tier of local government. The parish was again granted city status by letters patent dated 1 April 2009.

The council met in temporary offices until 2011, while the 18th-century Salisbury Guildhall was adapted.

Coat of arms
On 23 March 2010, the city council was granted a royal licence, transferring to it the armorial bearings of the previous City of New Sarum. The arms and supporters were originally recorded at the heraldic visitations of Wiltshire in 1565 and 1623. The blazon of the arms is:
Barry of eight Azure and Or. Supporters: On either side an eagle displayed with two heads Or, ducally gorged Azure.

There do not appear to be any meanings attached to the design. The traditional explanation that the blue stripes represent the rivers that meet in the city is now discounted. It has also been suggested that the eagles derive from the arms of the Bouverie family, Earls of Radnor, benefactors of the city. However, this also can be discounted, as the arms of the city were recorded before the family was connected with it.

Membership
The council has 24 members, elected by eight wards which each elect three councillors. Boundary changes confirmed in 2020 and applied at the 2021 election redrew wards in the central, Harnham, Milford and Bishopdown areas and increased the number of councillors from 23.

Elections to the city council took place on Thursday 6 May 2021. The current makeup of the council is shown below - those marked  are also Wiltshire Councillors.

History of control
At the first elections to the city council in 2009, the Liberal Democrats gained twelve seats, giving them a majority of one over all other parties.

At the next elections, on Thursday, 2 May 2013, no party had overall control. Days after the election, Jo Broom, who had been elected in Fisherton & Bemerton Village as a Liberal Democrat, joined the Conservatives. Then, following the resignation of a Conservative, there was a by-election in the St Martin's & Cathedral ward on 9 January 2014, won by Patricia Fagan for Labour.

In 2017, the Conservatives won an overall majority for the first time.

In 2021, the Conservatives lost their majority to no overall control.

Functions 
The council has some sixty empoyees and is responsible for the following properties and services:

Parks and associated public conveniences
Car parks
Cemeteries and Salisbury Crematorium
Play areas
Sports pitches
Open spaces
Allotments
Charter market
Charter fair
The Guildhall
Bemerton Heath neighbourhood centre
General fund shops and garages owned by the city prior to 1974
Events: Christmas Lights, St George's Day, Salisbury Food Festival, Music in the Parks, Britain in Bloom 
City Centre management 
General Community Fund

References

External links 
 
 

Parish councils of England
Local authorities in Wiltshire
Politics of Salisbury
Local precepting authorities in England